Reflections is a retrospective by Debby Boone that collects songs from the four Christian music albums she recorded in the 1980s, released in 1989.

While this was a compilation album, it still charted at #33 on the Top Contemporary Christian charts.

Track listing
"Sweet Adoration"
(from the 1980 album With My Song)
"Morningstar"
(from the 1980 album With My Song)
"Can You Reach My Friend"
(from the 1983 album Surrender)
"O Holy One"
(from the 1983 album Surrender)
"Keep the Flame Burning"
(from the 1983 album Surrender)
"Baruch Hashem Adonai"
"Surrender"
(from the 1983 album Surrender)
"The Heart of the Matter"
(from the 1985 album Choose Life)
"When I Accepted You"
(from the 1985 album Choose Life)
"To Every Generation"
(from the 1987 album Friends for Life)
"Sincerely Yours"
(from the 1987 album Friends for Life)

References

1989 compilation albums
Debby Boone albums